Namibia competed in the 2010 Commonwealth Games held in Delhi, India, from 3 to 14 October 2010. Namibia sent 28 athletes (19 male and 9 female) and 11 officials to the Games, which was fewer than it had in 2006. Namibian athletes competed in athletics, archery, boxing, cycling, gymnastics, bowls, shooting, and paralympics. It however won more medals then in 2006.

Medals

Medalists

Archery

 Benjamin Van Wyk
 Johannes Grobler
 Dirk Bockmuhl

Athletics

 Beata Naigambo
 Reinhold Iita

Boxing

 Sakaria Lukas
 Mikka Shonnena
 Mujandjae Kasuto
 Elias Nashivela
 Tobias Munihango
 Japhet Uutoni

Cycling

 Dan Craven
 Erik Hoffmann

Gymnastics

 Kimberly-Ann Van Zyl
 Robert Honnibal

Lawn Bowls

 Charlotte Morland
 Diana Viljoen
 Lesley Vermeulen
 Theuna Grobler
 Beatrix Lamprecht
 Willem Esterhuizen (Senior)
 Willem Esterhuizen (Junior)
 Jean Viljoen
 Graham Snyman
 Steven Peake

Shooting

 Gaby Ahrens
 Gielie Van Wyk

Paralympics
 Johanna Benson
 Ruben Soroseb

See also
 2010 Commonwealth Games

References

External links
  Times of india

2010
Nations at the 2010 Commonwealth Games
2010 in Namibian sport